Medagama is a village, located within the Uva Province, Sri Lanka. It is situated in the middle of a mountain range, hence the origin of its name: 'Meda' means middle and 'Gama' is village.

Society

Schools 
 Medagama National School
 Dahagoniya Kanitu Viduhala
 Kandavinna Vidyalaya
 Monaravana Kanitu Viduhala
 Bakinigahawela Sinhala Vidyalaya
 Medagama Muslim School
 Bakinigahawela Muslim School

Hospitals 
 Medagama Central Hospital
 Bakinigahawela Dispensary
 Senpathigama Dispensary

Religious Places 
 Medagama Sri Anandarama Viharaya
 Thimbiriya Purana Rajamaha Viharaya
 Kandavinna Viharaya
 kinnarabova Viharaya
 Nilvalagoda Viharaya
 Pothubandana Rajamaha Viharaya
 kotabowa Devalaya

Public Banks 
 Bank of Ceylon
 Peoples Bank
 Regional Development Bank

Gallery

External links

Lunugala-Uva Province 

Populated places in Uva Province